John Cokeworthy (fl. 1377–1399) was an English politician.

He was a Member (MP) of the Parliament of England for Liskeard in January 1377 and January 1390, Launceston in October 1377, January 1380, 1381, May 1382, October 1382, October 1383, April 1384, November 1384, 1385, 1386, February 1388, January 1390, 1391, 1393, 1395,  January 1397, and 1399 and Lostwithiel in 1378.

References

Year of birth missing
Year of death missing
English MPs January 1377
English MPs January 1390
English MPs October 1377
English MPs January 1380
English MPs 1381
English MPs May 1382
English MPs October 1382
English MPs October 1383
English MPs April 1384
English MPs November 1384
English MPs 1385
English MPs 1386
English MPs February 1388
English MPs 1391
English MPs 1393
English MPs 1395
English MPs January 1397
English MPs 1399
14th-century English politicians
Members of the pre-1707 English Parliament for constituencies in Cornwall